The 2013 NCAA Division I men's soccer tournament was the 55th edition of the tournament. The four team College Cup finals tournament was held at PPL Park in Chester, Pennsylvania on December 13 and 15, 2013.  On December 15, Notre Dame defeated Maryland, 2–1, to win its first national title.

Qualified Teams

A total of 48 teams qualified into the tournament proper, either automatically, or through an at-large bid that is determined by a selection committee. Each conference that field varsity soccer teams is awarded one automatic berth into the tournament. Depending on the conference, that automatic berth is either given the champions of the regular season, or the tournament that culminates the regular season. Twenty-two teams earn automatic bids into the tournament, while 26 enter through an at-large bid.

Format 
Like previous editions of the NCAA Division I Tournament, the tournament featured 48 participants out of a possible field of 198 teams. Of the 48 berths, 23 were allocated to the conference tournament or regular season winners. The remaining 25 berths were supposed to be determined through an at-large process based upon teams' Ratings Percentage Index (RPI) that did not win their conference tournament.

The NCAA Selection Committee also named the top sixteen seeds for the tournament, with those teams receiving an automatic bye into the second round of the tournament. The remaining 32 teams played in a single-elimination match in the first round of the tournament for the right to play a seeded team in the second round.

Seeded teams 

 Automatic A = Conference tournament winner.
 Automatic B =Conference regular season champion, conference has no tournament.

Schedule

Bracket

Regional 1

Regional 2

Regional 3

Regional 4

College Cup – PPL Park, Chester, Pennsylvania

Results

First round

Second round

Third round

Quarterfinals

College Cup

Semifinals

Championship

Statistics

Goalscorers
5 goals

  Patrick Mullins – Maryland
  Patrick Hodan – Notre Dame

3 goals

  Wojciech Wojcik – Bradley
  Alec Sundly – California
  Cyle Larin – Connecticut
  Harry Shipp – Notre Dame

2 goals

  Reinaldo Brenes – Akron
  Mamadou Diouf – Connecticut
  Michael Sauers – Maryland
  Geoff Fries – Navy
  Evan Panken – Notre Dame
  Tim Hopkinson – Old Dominion
  Miguel Gonzalez – Seattle
  Victor Chavez – UCLA
  Leo Stolz – UCLA
  Todd Wharton – Virginia
  Ryan Zinkhan – Virginia

1 goal

  Aodhan Quinn – Akron
  Scott Davis – Bradley
  Steve Birnbaum – California
  Stefano Bonomo – California
  Thales Moreno – Clemson
  Sergio Camargo – Coastal Carolina
  Ricky Garbanzo – Coastal Carolina
  Jakub Štourač – Coastal Carolina
  Kwame Awuah – Connecticut
  Kareem Morad – Connecticut
  Nicholas Zuniga – Connecticut
  Sonny Makh – Creighton
  Guillermo Delgado – Delaware
  Jared Girard – Drexel
  Jason Waterman – Elon
  Bakie Goodman – Georgetown
  Alex Muyl – Georgetown
  Cole Seiler – Georgetown
  Timi Mulgrew – George Mason
  Wes Sever – George Mason
  Jacob Bushue – Indiana
  Dylan Lax – Indiana
  Adrien Perez – Loyola Marymount
  Coco Navarro – Marquette
  James Nortey – Marquette
  Jake Pace – Maryland
  Alex Shinsky – Maryland
  Jay Chapman – Michigan State
  Tim Kreutz – Michigan State
  Adam Montague – Michigan State
  Jamie Dubyoski – Navy
  Martin Sanchez – Navy
  Oniel Fisher – New Mexico
  Riley McGovern – New Mexico
  Ben McKendry – New Mexico
  James Rogers – New Mexico
  Omar Holness – North Carolina
  Nikko Boxall – Northwestern
  Grant Wilson – Northwestern
  Leon Brown – Notre Dame
  Vince Cicciarelli – Notre Dame
  Andrew O'Malley – Notre Dame
  Jesse Miralrio – Old Dominion
  Sidney Rivera – Old Dominion
  Cole Stringer – Old Dominion
  Alec Neumann – Penn
  Eli Dennis – Penn State
  Connor Maloney – Penn State
  Simon Hinde – Quinnipiac
  Wilder Arboleda – Providence
  Phil Towler – Providence
  Chase Hanson – Seattle
  Michael Roberts – Seattle
  Gabriel Camara – St. John's
  Jordan Rouse – St. John's
  Zach Batteer – Stanford
  Matt Taylor – Stanford
  Christopher Santana – UC Irvine
  Aaron Simmons – UCLA
  Joe Sofia – UCLA
  Felix Vobejda – UCLA
  Geaton Caltabiano – UMBC
  Pete Caringi – UMBC
  Jordan Allen – Virginia
  Eric Bird – Virginia
  Darius Madison – Virginia
  Scott Thomsen – Virginia
  Michael Gamble – Wake Forest
  Ricky Greensfelder – Wake Forest
  Tolani Ibikunle – Wake Forest
  Sean Okoli – Wake Forest
  Josh Heard – Washington
  Darwin Jones – Washington
  Ian Lange – Washington
  Mason Robertson – Washington
  Cristian Roldan – Washington
  Jackson Eskay – William & Mary
  Roshan Patel – William & Mary
  Chris Prince – Wisconsin

Own goals
  Tolani Ibikunle – Wake Forest (playing against Notre Dame)

Footnotes

References

External links 

Tournament
NCAA Division I Men's Soccer Tournament seasons
NCAA Division I men's soccer tournament
NCAA Division I men's soccer tournament
NCAA Division I men's soccer tournament
NCAA Division I men's soccer tournament